Lewis Springer (October 30, 1835 – November 25, 1895) was a farmer and political figure in Ontario, Canada. He represented Wentworth South in the House of Commons of Canada from 1882 to 1887 as a Liberal member.

He was born in Hamilton, Upper Canada, a descendant of United Empire Loyalists, and was educated at Victoria College in Cobourg.

References 
 
The Canadian parliamentary companion, 1883, AJ Gemmill

1835 births
1895 deaths
Members of the House of Commons of Canada from Ontario
Conservative Party of Canada (1867–1942) MPs